Tomorrow's Sounds Today is the eleventh studio album by American country music artist Dwight Yoakam. This album was released on October 31, 2000. It rose to No. 7 on the Billboard Country Albums chart. There were two charting singles among its tracks: "What Do You Know About Love" at No. 26 and "I Want You to Want Me" (a cover of the 1979 Cheap Trick hit) at No. 49 on the Hot Country Songs chart. Also included are two duets with Buck Owens, who was a big influence on Yoakam's musical style. It was also Yoakam's last studio album for the Reprise label. After that album's release, Yoakam left Reprise for Warner Bros. in 2001.

Background
In the Nineties, Yoakam had been a musician who dabbled in movies, but by 2000 he was absorbed in a film project of his own called South of Heaven - West of Hell.  This left his music career in the lurch in the latter part of the decade, with his releases becoming more sporadic.  Yoakam and producer-guitarist Pete Anderson had helped revitalize the genre of country music in the late Eighties and early Nineties, scoring a triple platinum high point with This Time in 1993.  However, with the release of Gone in 1995, Yoakam’s commercial stock took a nosedive, and his growing preoccupation with acting left Anderson perplexed, with the producer later reflecting in 2003:

 
 
While Yoakam nursed his acting bug, country radio’s youth-obsessed fixation continued and the singer developed a strained relationship with his label Reprise.  The sole hit during this period was a cover of the Queen song “Crazy Little Thing Called Love,” which hit #12 on the country singles chart and rose to #64 on Billboard’s Hot 100. The song appeared on the 1999 compilation Last Chance for a Thousand Years: Dwight Yoakam's Greatest Hits from the 90's, which was followed by an acoustic album of remakes the following year, and these two releases lend credence to the notion that Yoakam was consumed to a degree by his film-making aspirations.  As biographer Don McCleese put it, if the singer “had sounded a little distracted on the offhand Tomorrow’s Sounds Today, he was plainly preoccupied with South of Heaven – West of Hell – a film written, directed, and produced by Dwight Yoakam, starring Dwight Yoakam, with music by Dwight Yoakam.”

Recording and composition
Yoakam's 1998 release A Long Way Home was a return to a more country sound, and Tomorrow’s Sounds Today takes this approach even further; in fact, it is arguably his straightest country studio album since 1988’s Buenos Noches from Lonely Room.  Like A Long Way Home, this LP has a brighter musical atmosphere than the “noirish streak” that ran through previous works like This Time and Gone.  On the first single “What Do You Know About Love” the narrator is cautiously optimistic over a new love, admitting “My heart’s so often been wrong,” while on the opener “Love Caught Up with Me,” the narrator surrenders completely with the lines “Baby, I couldn’t hide, no matter how hard I tried…”  Pete Anderson’s guitar work on “Free to Go” evokes the Allman Brothers over a Johnny Cash rhythm as the song ponders the elusive nature of love.  Anderson also displays some fine fretwork on the rocking “A Place to Cry,” but for the most part Yoakam and Anderson keep it country, emphasizing Gary Morse’s pedal steel and returning to their roots, as if they sensed their partnership was nearing its end.  In his AllMusic review of the album Hal Horowitz writes:

Further cementing the full circle vibe are the two duets with Buck Owens that conclude the album.  Yoakam coaxed Owens out of semi-retirement in 1988 and scored his first #1 country hit with their remake of “Streets of Bakersfield,” and they return to the Tex-Mex flavour with “Alright, I’m Wrong” (Anderson’s only writing credit on a Yoakam LP) and the spirited “I Was There.”

Perhaps trying to capture lightning in a bottle after the recent hit with Queen’s “Crazy Little Thing Called Love,” Yoakam tried his hand at another 70's rock classic, Cheap Trick’s “I Want You to Want Me,” but it was not as successful.

Reception
AllMusic praises the LP, opining, “With Tomorrow's Sounds Today, Dwight Yoakam has fashioned a contemporary roots-conscious country album whose qualities, like the artist's distinctive style, are timeless.”   However, in his book A Thousand Miles from Nowhere, ex-Rolling Stone writer Don McCleese takes a dim view, calling it “an album of retrenchment, one that reinforces Yoakam’s persona as a county artist rather than extending it, with too many of the cuts sounding like retreads.”

Track listing
All songs written by Dwight Yoakam except where noted.
"Love Caught Up to Me" - 3:50
"What Do You Know About Love" - 2:56
"Time Spent Missing You" - 3:05
"Free to Go" - 4:48
"A Promise You Can't Keep" - 3:11
"A Place to Cry" - 4:35
"The Sad Side of Town" (Yoakam, Buck Owens) - 2:52
"Dreams of Clay" - 3:51
"For Love's Sake" - 3:06
"The Heartaches Are Free" - 2:55
"A World of Blue" - 2:21
"I Want You to Want Me" (Rick Nielsen) - 3:28
"Alright, I'm Wrong" (Pete Anderson, Cisco) - 4:16
duet with Buck Owens
"I Was There" (Owens) - 3:04
duet with Buck Owens

Personnel
From liner notes.
Pete Anderson – electric guitar, baritone guitar, percussion
Al Bonhomme – acoustic guitar
Jim Christie – drums
Jonathan Clark – background vocals
Skip Edwards – keyboards
Chris Hillman – mandolin
Flaco Jiménez – accordion
Scott Joss – fiddle
Jim Lauderdale – background vocals
Gary Morse — steel guitar, lap steel guitar
Buck Owens – duet vocals on "Alright, I'm Wrong" and "I Was There"
Taras Prodaniuk – bass guitar
Don Reed – fiddle
Dwight Yoakam – lead vocals, acoustic guitar

Charts

Weekly charts

Year-end charts

Singles

References

Bibliography

Dwight Yoakam albums
2000 albums
Albums produced by Pete Anderson
Reprise Records albums